The Speaker was the presiding officer of the Fijian House of Representatives.  At its first session following a general election, the House members elected a Speaker and a Deputy Speaker. With a view to ensuring impartiality, the Speaker was not allowed to be a member of the House, though he was required to qualify for membership. The Deputy Speaker, however, was elected from among members of the House.

The office of Speaker was an essential feature of the parliamentary system, and has proved to be the most durable of all the Westminster parliamentary traditions.

The House of Representatives of Fiji was preceded by Legislative Council of Fiji. In the 2013 Constitution, the House of Representatives was abolished, and replaced by a single chamber Parliament.

List of speakers of the House of Representatives of Fiji (1970–2013)

References

See also
House of Representatives of Fiji
Senate of Fiji
President of the Senate of Fiji

Fiji, House of Representatives, Speakers
Fiji, House of Representatives
Speaker of the House